Sean Hughes (10 November 1965 – 16 October 2017) was a British-born Irish comedian, writer and actor. He starred in his own Channel 4 television show Sean's Show and was one of the regular team captains on the BBC Two musical panel game Never Mind the Buzzcocks.

Early life
Hughes was born the middle boy in a family of three boys in Whittington Hospital in North London. He had an older brother Alan and a younger brother Martin. He was born in Archway, London, but spent most of his youth in Firhouse, Dublin. His mother was from Cork, while his father was from Dublin; they first met on a London bus. His father worked in a telephone exchange and was also a driving instructor. At the age of six, Hughes moved to Dublin and lived with his paternal grandmother. He attended Coláiste Éanna in Ballyroan.

Writing in The Guardian, Bruce Dessau observed of Hughes's early years:
[He] used to talk about how sounding like a Cockney in an Irish school was not easy. He later quipped that he spent "most of my childhood in a headlock". Not surprisingly his Mary Poppins accent soon developed a lilting local burr. Making schoolfriends laugh was a classic defence mechanism and he even set up comedy gigs at his school. What started out as a hobby quickly became a career.

Career
In 1987, he began appearing at the Comedy Store. In 1990, aged 24, he became the youngest winner of the prestigious Perrier Comedy Award for his show, A One-Night Stand with Sean Hughes.

He marked his 30th birthday with the Sean Hughes Is Thirty Somehow tour, which was broadcast on Channel 4, in 1995. Hughes returned to stand-up, touring the UK and Australia in 2007 with his show, The Right Side of Wrong.

As well as comedy, he wrote collections of prose and poetry and worked on a number of films. He also presented weekend radio shows on the BBC's London radio station BBC GLR, and in 2002 joined BBC 6 Music, presenting the Sunday morning programme. He left the station a year after its launch, proclaiming it had turned into everything he had wanted it to be. He also wrote two novels, The Detainees (1998) and It's What He Would Have Wanted (2000).

It was reported that Hughes was a close friend of the American comedian Bill Hicks, but Hughes stated this was not true. In a 2014 interview, he explained: "It says on my Wikipedia page that I was good friends with him. I wasn't! We were in Australia together, so we hung out. I did get to know him a little bit, which was a real pleasure. When I saw him I just went, 'That's the best comic I'm going to see in my lifetime.'" Nevertheless, Hughes wrote the foreword to Cynthia True's biography of Hicks, American Scream: The Bill Hicks Story. He concluded his foreword by writing "being a genius is a heavy burden and he's the only one I'm ever likely to meet. I still miss you Bill."

Film and television drama
Hughes had a small role in the film The Commitments (1991), playing a record producer.

In 1992, he had his own TV show, Sean's Show, ostensibly set in his own home. It received a nomination for the 1992 British Comedy Award for Best Channel 4 Sitcom. Series one of Sean's Show has been released on DVD. Later, he recorded a series of brief programmes called Sean's Shorts, in which he toured England, visiting many of the country's towns and cities, visiting local places of interest and meeting local people. He appeared in the film Snakes and Ladders shot in Dublin, and released in 1996.

From 1996 to 2002, he was a team captain on the BBC2 comedy quiz show Never Mind the Buzzcocks, alongside Phill Jupitus and Mark Lamarr. He can be seen during Terrorvision's music video for their single "Tequila" from 1999 and in the video for The Cure's 1996 single, "The 13th". He appeared in the 2010 Edinburgh Fringe.

In ITV's series The Last Detective, featuring "Dangerous" Davies, Hughes played his friend, the perpetually unemployed and well-read "Mod Lewis" (he spends all his time at the library to save on heating). He played Eileen Grimshaw's love interest Pat in the British soap Coronation Street.

In 2003, Hughes voiced the part of Finbar the clockwork Shark, one of seven plastic bath toys which come to life whenever no-one is watching in the children's television series Rubbadubbers, shown on CBeebies in the United Kingdom for pre-school children.

He played Sergeant Lake in the ITV Agatha Christie's Marple production of They Do It with Mirrors, which was broadcast on 1 January 2010.

Hughes played Brendan in the film version of Tony Hawks' book, Round Ireland with a Fridge (2010). He also played the lead in the film adaptation of Spike Milligan's comic novel, Puckoon. Hughes also voiced Tapir in the three Robbie the Reindeer films.

He appeared in Casualty in 2015.

Stage and online
In early 2014, Hughes started a podcast called Under the Radar, which ran for approximately 57 episodes (excluding repeats and split episodes) until December 2016.

Hughes took over the role of stationmaster Mr Perks in the musical The Railway Children at King's Cross Theatre in March 2015.

Personal life

Hughes was a vegetarian and proponent of animal rights. Hughes was a heavy drinker most of his career. In 2012, it was reported that he had become a teetotaller.

Death
Hughes died aged 51 on 16 October 2017 from the effects of cirrhosis, at Whittington Hospital in North London (the same hospital he was born in).

A funeral service was held at St Pancras and Islington Cemetery on 23 October 2017, where, after the mourning party heard eulogies to his memory, extracts of some of Hughes' poetry were recited, and recorded music from The Smiths and Lily Allen was played, his body was cremated. A wake was held afterwards in a nearby pub.

Works

Shows
Mumbo Jumbo
Penguins
Life Becomes Noises
Ducks and Other Mistakes I've Made
What I Meant to Say Was...
The Right Side of Wrong
Live... And Seriously Funny
A One Night Stand with Sean Hughes

Books
Sean's Book (1993) 
The Grey Area (1995) 
The Detainees (1998) 
It's What He Would Have Wanted (2000)  
My Struggle to Be Decent and Poems of Sadness and Light

Music
 Bubonique – 20 Golden Showers (1993)
 Bubonique – Trance Arse Vol 3 (1995)
Sly Curl - Cinerama (2002) - Sean performs a poem at the end of the song

References

External links
 
 Sean Hughes at the British Film Institute
 Sean Hughes on Chortle
 

1965 births
2017 deaths
20th-century English comedians
20th-century English male actors
20th-century Irish comedians
20th-century Irish male actors
21st-century English comedians
21st-century English male actors
21st-century Irish comedians
21st-century Irish male actors
Alcohol-related deaths in England
Deaths from cirrhosis
English male comedians
English male television actors
English people of Irish descent
Irish male comedians
Irish male television actors
Male actors from London
People educated at Coláiste Éanna
People from Archway, London
People from South Dublin (county)